Davudoba (also, Davidoba) is a village and municipality in the Quba Rayon of Azerbaijan. It has a population of 510.

References

Populated places in Quba District (Azerbaijan)